Korntawat Samran (born 15 December 1997) is a Thai equestrian. He competed in the individual eventing at the 2020 Summer Olympics.

References

External links
 

1997 births
Living people
Korntawat Samran
Korntawat Samran
Equestrians at the 2020 Summer Olympics
Korntawat Samran
Event riders
Asian Games medalists in equestrian
Equestrians at the 2018 Asian Games
Medalists at the 2018 Asian Games
Korntawat Samran
Korntawat Samran